Gros blanc is the name for several French and Italian wine grape varieties including:

Elbling weiss
Gouais blanc
Graisse
Luglienga
Melon (grape)
Petoin
Prié blanc
Sacy (grape)